Kindl may refer to:

 Gabriella Kindl, Hungarian and Montenegrin handball player
 Ivana Kindl, Croatian singer
 Jakub Kindl, Czech ice hockey player
 Manuel Kindl, German ice hockey player
 Patrice Kindl, American novelist
 Wolfgang Kindl, Austrian luger
 Kindl (hotel), established in 1474

See also
 Münchner Kindl

German-language surnames